The Utah Office of Tourism is a government agency which aims to increase tourism to the state of Utah. This increase would provide revenue to Utah, easing the burden on taxpayers.

History 
The Utah Office of Tourism has gone through many changes to become what it is today. Before a specific office for tourism existed, a variety of departments and offices were responsible for marketing Utah to potential visitors and businesses. 
Prior to 1967, tourism and publicity were under the direction of numerous departments, including the Department of Publicity and Industrial Development in 1941, the Road and Tourist Information Office in 1952, and the Utah Tourist and Publicity Council in 1953.
The Utah Tourist Council handled most of the publicity for the state until the creation of the Division of Travel Development in 1967. As part of the Department of Development Services, this division increased direction while consolidating tourism and publicity goals.”  In 1979, the Department of Development Services turned into the Department of Community and Economic Development, but its focus remained the same. 
The Utah Tourist Council established many of the features found in the current Office of Tourism, but operated on a much smaller scale than it does today.
The Utah Office of Tourism, as it is known today, was finally created in 2005 by Governor Jon Huntsman as part of the new Utah Governor’s Office of Economic Development.

Structure  
As a part of the legislation that created UOT, the legislature formed a 13-member Board of Tourism Development, which is responsible for advising and directing the efforts of the office. This board is composed of individuals from across the tourism industry. They are appointed by the Governor and serve a four-year term. As an advisory board, they approve the marketing and branding efforts the office develops, and authorize spending and other activities.

Funding & Budget

Funding 
UOT’s funding comes from three main sources: the General Fund, the Tourism Marketing Performance Fund, and the Transportation Fund. The General Fund provides the base operations budget of UOT at over $4 million per year. The Tourism Marketing Performance Fund, on the other hand, is tied to UOT’s performance—the amount of money is derived from a formula that takes into account performance over the last four years based on “increases in sales tax revenue for 21 tourism related industries.”  Finally, UOT also receives a small appropriation from the Transportation Fund to pay for UOT’s work with the welcome centers across the state.

Budget 
UOT’s budget falls into four major categories:

Administration 
Expenses under Administration are used mostly for salaries of personnel.

Operations and Fulfillment 
Operation and Fulfillment funds are responsible for tourism information distribution, cooperation of other partners, and coordination of the scenic byway program and specialty projects.

Marketing and Advertising 
Funds in Marketing and Advertising are spent on branding efforts, advertising, and promotional activities in the media and travel trade.

Film Commission 
The Utah Film Commission markets the entire state as a destination for motion picture, television, and commercial industries. The film commission acts as an individual entity under GOED but reports to the Managing Director of UOT.

Sundance Film Festival
The Sundance Film Festival caters to independent filmmakers in the United States and has received recognition from the industry as a place to open films. In 2008, Sundance exhibited 125 feature-length films from 34 countries, with more than 50,000 attendees. The name Sundance comes from his Sundance Kid character.  Redford also owned a restaurant called Zoom, located on Main Street in the former mining town of Park City, until its closure in May 2017.

Sundance Channel
Robert Redford founded: the Sundance Institute, Sundance Cinemas, Sundance Catalog, and the Sundance Channel, all in and around Park City, Utah, 30 miles (48 km) north of the Sundance ski area.

Prior Year's Budgets 
The following is a breakdown of UOT's operational budget from 2008-2012.

References

External links 
The Utah Office of Tourism
Utah Tourism Website

Tourism in Utah